Joermungandr is an extinct genus of recumbirostran tetrapod from the Late Carboniferous Mazon Creek fossil beds of Illinois. It currently contains a single species, Joermungandr bolti. Like many other recumbirostrans, the body is elongated, which is likely an adaptation for fossoriality (digging and living underground).

References 

Recumbirostrans
Fossil taxa described in 2021